Jürgen Schröder (born 16 December 1960, in Hamm) is a German water polo player.

See also
 List of Olympic medalists in water polo (men)
 List of World Aquatics Championships medalists in water polo

External links
 

1960 births
Living people
Sportspeople from Hamm
German male water polo players
Olympic water polo players of Germany
Olympic water polo players of West Germany
Water polo players at the 1984 Summer Olympics
Olympic bronze medalists for West Germany
Olympic medalists in water polo
Medalists at the 1984 Summer Olympics